Francesco Cappelli (born 17 September 1943 in Barberino Val d'Elsa) is a retired Italian professional football player.

He played 5 seasons (80 games, no goals) in the Serie A for S.S.C. Venezia and A.S. Roma.

Honours
 Coppa Italia winner: 1968/69.

External links
Profile at Almanaccogiallorosso.it

1943 births
Living people
Italian footballers
Serie A players
Serie B players
A.S. Roma players
Venezia F.C. players
Taranto F.C. 1927 players
Association football defenders
People from Barberino Val d'Elsa
Sportspeople from the Metropolitan City of Florence
Footballers from Tuscany